Christopher William Boroughs (born 21 April 1975) is an English cricketer.  Boroughs is a right-handed batsman who bowls right-arm medium pace.  He was born in Stourbridge, Worcestershire.

Boroughs made his debut for Herefordshire in the 1998 MCCA Knockout Trophy  against Wiltshire.  From 1998 to present, he has represented the county in 44 Trophy matches.  His Minor Counties Championship debut came against Dorset in 1998.  From 1998 to present, he has represented the county in 78 Championship matches.

He also represented Herefordshire in List A cricket.  His debut List A match came against Middlesex at Lord's in the 1998 NatWest Trophy.  From 1998 to 2004, he represented the county in 12 List A matches, the last of which came against Worcestershire in the 2nd round of the 2004 Cheltenham & Gloucester Trophy.  In his 12 matches, he scored 322 runs at a batting average of 32.20, with 3 half centuries and a high score of 72.  In the field he took 4 catches.  With the ball he took 4 wickets at a bowling average of 38.75, with best figures of 2/41.

Boroughs was captain of Herefordshire until 2012 and captained Auckland A in 2002.

References

External links
Christopher Boroughs at Cricinfo
Christopher Boroughs at CricketArchive

1975 births
Living people
Sportspeople from Stourbridge
English cricketers
Herefordshire cricketers
Herefordshire cricket captains